Lake Hill is a hamlet in Ulster County, New York, United States. Lake Hill has a post office with ZIP code 12448, which opened on January 10, 1854.

References

Hamlets in Ulster County, New York
Hamlets in New York (state)